Henderson Stadium may refer to:
 Spitz Stadium or Henderson Stadium, a stadium in Lethbridge, Alberta, Canada
 Henderson Stadium (Macon, Georgia), a stadium in Macon, Georgia, U.S.
 Henderson Stadium (Alcorn State), a stadium in Lorman, Mississippi, U.S.